Pseudoclanis kakamegae is a moth of the  family Sphingidae. It is known from the Kakamega rainforest in Kenya.

References

Pseudoclanis
Moths described in 2007
Moths of Africa